The 2010 U.S. Men's Clay Court Championships was a men's tennis tournament played on outdoor clay courts. It was the 42nd edition of the U.S. Men's Clay Court Championships, and was an ATP World Tour 250 event. It took place at River Oaks Country Club in Houston, Texas, United States, from April 5 through April 11, 2010. Unseeded Juan Ignacio Chela won the singles title.

Entrants

Seeds

Rankings and seedings are as of March 22.

Other entrants
The following players received wildcards into the main draw:
 Lleyton Hewitt
 Jerzy Janowicz
 Donald Young

The following players received entry via qualifying:
 Kevin Anderson
 Nick Lindahl
 Conor Niland
 Ryan Sweeting

Finals

Singles

 Juan Ignacio Chela defeated  Sam Querrey, 5–7, 6–4, 6–3
It was Chela's first title of the year and 5th of his career.

Doubles

 Bob Bryan /  Mike Bryan defeated  Stephen Huss /  Wesley Moodie, 6–3, 7–5

References

External links
 Official website

 
U.S. Men's Clay Court Championships
U.S. Men's Clay Court Championships
U.S. Men's Clay Court Championships
U.S. Men's Clay Court Championships
U.S. Men's Clay Court Championships